Jan Tesař (born 26 March 1990) is a Czech sprinter specialising in the 400 metres. He won the bronze medal in the 4 × 400 metres relay at the 2015 European Indoor Championships which took place in Prague.

His personal bests in the 400 metres are 46.65 seconds outdoors (Zürich 2014) and 46.21 seconds indoors (Prague 2015). He improved his PB significantly to 45.73 when winning bronze at the 2015 Universiade.

Competition record

References

1990 births
Living people
Czech male sprinters
World Athletics Championships athletes for the Czech Republic
Universiade medalists in athletics (track and field)
Universiade bronze medalists for the Czech Republic
Athletes (track and field) at the 2019 European Games
European Games medalists in athletics
European Games silver medalists for the Czech Republic
Medalists at the 2017 Summer Universiade
Medalists at the 2015 Summer Universiade